Bantam Presidency was a presidency established by the British East India Company and based at the Company factory at Bantam in Java. Founded in 1617, the Presidency exercised its authority over all the Company factories in India, including the agencies of Madras, Masulipatnam and Surat. The factors at Bantam were instrumental in founding the colony of Madraspatnam in 1639 with the Fort St. George, which later grew into the modern city of Madras. The Presidency of Bantam was twice downgraded, first in 1630 before being restored in 1634 and for the second time in 1653, when owing to the hostility of Dutch traders, the Presidency was shifted to Madras.

Bantam remained an agency under the suzerainty of Madras and then Surat until Bantam was captured by the Dutch in 1682 and the English factory closed. Following the loss of Bantam, the Company established a fortified settlement at Bencoolen in Sumatra (Fort York) in 1687. Fort St George was raised to the rank of presidency in 1684, its Governor and Council having responsibility for the factories on the Coromandel coast and in the Bay of Bengal. In the same year, Bombay was nominated to replace Surat as the centre of the Company's activities in the west of India and the Persian Gulf.

History 
In December 1602, a fleet of East India Company ships commanded by James Lancaster reached Bantam and negotiated with the Sultan of Bantam over pepper trade and the opening of a settlement. A factory was eventually opened with eight factors headed by William Starkey as Governor and Thomas Morgan as his deputy. Bantam was one of the oldest possessions of the East India Company and older than all Indian colonies. But seven of the eight factors perished with Morgan in April 1603 and Starkey, himself, in June 1603. Starkey was succeeded as Governor by Edmund Scott. When a second voyage commanded by Sir Henry Middleton reached Bantam, Scott had succeeded as Governor being the only member of the original expedition who was still alive. The early days of the colony were marred by death due to disease and Dutch hostilities. Scott was succeeded by John Saris who became the second Englishman after William Adams to set foot on Japan.
 
Upon successful negotiations with the Mughal Emperor Jahangir, the East India Company was permitted to conduct trade in India unmolested and opened factories at Masulipatnam (in 1610) and Surat (in 1612). But Bantam remained their principal possession though it was being rapidly eclipsed in importance by Surat whose position was further boosted by the English victory over the Portuguese at the Battle of Swally (1612 & 1614). Then in 1617, the position of Bantam was further enhanced when its Governor was designated President and given control of all English factories in South-East Asia and India, including Masulipatnam and Surat. Two years later, in 1619, the English signed a "Treaty of Defence" with the Dutch by which they agreed not to attack each other.

However, shortly after the conclusion of peace, hostilities again resumed and the then President of Bantam, Towerson was captured by the Dutch in February 1623 and executed. This was followed by a wholesale attack on all English settlements in South-East Asia. By 1624, the English were forced to vacate the East Indies, Malay peninsula and Siam. The Bantam factory was revived in 1629 but made subordinate to Surat. Bantam functioned as an agency subordinate to Surat till 1634-35 when the Presidency was restored.

In 1628, the English factors at Masulipatnam were forced to move to the factory of Armagaon which they had established in 1625-26 due to increased hostility of the Sultan of Golconda. The agency of Masulipatnam was restored in 1632, but the factory of Armagaon fell into decline due to bad climate. Forced to look for a better place to settle, factor Francis Day of Masulipatnam landed at the town of Madraspatnam in further south in the year 1639 and concluded an agreement with the Raja of Chandragiri to set up a factory. The following year, the Armagaon factory was moved to Madraspatnam and an agency was set up with Andrew Cogan as Agent. The Fort St. George was constructed in 1644.

End of the English factory

With Anglo-Dutch relations worsening, the Bantam factory was finally vacated and the seat of the Presidency was moved to Madras in 1653. The factory was soon reestablished however.

In 1682, the factory was abruptly closed down for having taken the losing side in a civil war between the reigning sultan, passively backed by the English, and his rebellious son, who had asked for help from the Dutch. In March, the Dutch landed a considerable force from Batavia and placed the son on the throne, obtaining in exchange exclusive privilege to trade in his territories. On 1 April, a party of Dutch and native soldiers occupied the factory and the factor and the other English were forced to embark with their property on vessels which took them to Batavia, and thence to Surat in August the following year.

Agencies 

When the Presidency of Bantam was formed in 1617, there were two agencies that were placed subordinate to the President of Bantam - the agency of Masulipatnam and the agency of Surat.

 Masulipatnam 1610 - 1629, 1634 - 1653
 Pattani 1610 - 1623
 Pettipollee
 Mocha 1618
 Jask 1619
 Macassar
 Acin
 Agra 1620
 Patna 1620
 Ormuz 1622
 Armagaon 1625 - 1653
 Thatta 1634

List of governors of Bantam 
 William Starkey 1602 - 1603
 Edmund Scott 1603 - 1605
 John Saris 1605 - 1609
 Augustine Spalding 1609
 Henworth 1609 -1610
 Edward Needles 1610
 Richard Woodies 1610 -1614
 John Jourdain 1614 - 1615
 George Berkeley 1615 - 1617

List of presidents 
 George Ball (March 1617 - September 1618)
 John Jackson 1618 - 1619
 John Powell 1619
 Gabriel Towerson 1619 - 1622
 George Willoughby 1624 - 1630
 George Willoughby 1632 - 1636
 Robert Coulson 1636 - 1639
 Aaron Baker 1639 - 1641
 Ralph Cartwright 1641 - 1646
 Aaron Baker 1646 - 1649
 Frederick Skinner 1649 - 1652

References 

 
 

History of Chennai
1617 establishments in the British Empire